Scandinavian Race is an annual bicycle road race held in Uppsala, Sweden. Between the years 1909–1937 and 1940–1945 the race was run as a time trial; in 1956 it was held as a team time trial. Since 2008, it is organized as a 1.2 event on the UCI Europe Tour. In 2020 and 2021, due to the COVID-19 pandemic in Sweden, the Scandinavian Race was held as the Swedish National Road Race Championships.

Winners

References

External links

Cycle races in Sweden
UCI Europe Tour races
Recurring sporting events established in 1909
1909 establishments in Sweden
Spring (season) events in Sweden